Goulding may refer to:
 Goulding (surname), including a list of people with the name
 Goulding Chemicals, supplier of agricultural fertilisers and industrial chemicals to the Irish market
 Goulding, Florida, a census-designated place (CDP) in Escambia County, Florida, United States
 Goulding's Trading Post, a lodge, trading post, and museum located just north of the Arizona–Utah border

See also
 Golding (disambiguation)